The Saint-Sever Beatus, also known as the Apocalypse of Saint-Sever (Paris, Bibliothèque Nationale, MS lat. 8878), is a Romanesque Illuminated manuscript from the 11th century. The manuscript was made at Saint-Sever Abbey, then in the Duchy of Gascony, under the direction of Gregory of Montaner, abbot between 1028 and 1072.  It is believed that primary artist-scribe who illustrated the manuscript was Stephanus Garsia (who signed his name on folio 6), working alongside other unnamed individuals.

The manuscript contains the Commentary on the Apocalypse of Beatus of Liébana, a commentary on Daniel by Saint Jerome and a treatise on the Virgin Mary by Saint Ildefonsus. Parts of it are displayed in the Musée des Jacobins in Saint-Sever.

Gallery

References

External links
 Information and many pictures
Facsimile edition, with information on the Commentary on the Apocalypse and sample illustrations

Illuminated beatus manuscripts
Bibliothèque nationale de France collections
11th-century books
Mozarabic art and architecture